58 Eridani is a main-sequence star in the constellation Eridanus. It is a solar analogue, having similar physical properties to the Sun. The star has a relatively high proper motion across the sky, and it is located 43 light years distant. It is a probable member of the IC 2391 moving group of stars that share a common motion through space.

Characteristics
This is a BY Draconis variable with the designation IX Eridani, which ranges in magnitude from 5.47 down to 5.51 with a period of 11.3 days. The X-ray emissions from this star's corona indicate an age of less than a billion (109) years, compared to 4.6 billion for the Sun, so it is still relatively young for a star of its mass. Starspot activity has also been detected, which varies from year to year.

A circumstellar disc of dust particles has been detected
in orbit around 58 Eridani.

See also
List of nearest bright stars

References

External links
 
 

Eridanus (constellation)
G-type main-sequence stars
Solar analogs
Eridani, 58
0177
Durchmusterung objects
1532
022263
030495
BY Draconis variables
Eridani, 58